Heteromirafra is a small genus of African larks in the family Alaudidae.

Taxonomy and systematics
The name "long-clawed lark" has been used to describe both species in this genus.

Species
The genus contains two extant species:

References

 
Bird genera
Taxonomy articles created by Polbot